Seyyed Morad (also Romanized as Seyyed Morād) is a village in Shusef Rural District, Shusef District, Nehbandan County, South Khorasan Province, Iran. At the 2006 census, its population was 104, in 31families.

References 

Populated places in Nehbandan County